The 1996 Furman Paladins football team was an American football team that represented Furman University as a member of the Southern Conference (SoCon) during the 1996 NCAA Division I-AA football season. In their third year under head coach Bobby Johnson, the Paladins compiled an overall record of 9–4, with a mark of 6–2 in conference play, finishing third in the SoCon. In the playoffs, Furman defeated Northern Arizona in the first round and were defeated by Marshall in the quarterfinals.

Schedule

References

Furman
Furman Paladins football seasons
Furman Paladins football